Events from the year 1792 in Poland

Incumbents
 Monarch – Stanisław II August

Events

 
 - Great Sejm
 - Polish–Russian War of 1792

Births

Deaths

References

 
Years of the 18th century in Poland